The C sets were a class of electric multiple units that operated on Sydney's suburban rail network from 1986 up until 2021. Built by A Goninan & Co between 1986 and 1987, they were introduced into service by the State Rail Authority, before later being operated under CityRail and Sydney Trains. A total of 56 carriages were built, with the last sets being withdrawn from service in February 2021, having been gradually replaced by A & B set trains.

Design & construction
The C sets were a follow-on from the K sets. They were built as an interim measure due to delays with the Tangara program. They were also used to train and familiarise staff with the new (at the time) chopper technology. The C sets were the first Sydney suburban trains to be fitted with chopper control, which gives the train smoother acceleration. Gate turn-off thyristors (GTO) were used to control power to the traction motors, hence allowing for smoother acceleration. Following the successful implementation of chopper control, these features were installed on the Tangara and later V set carriages.

The C set carriages were also the first on the suburban network to feature fixed seating (originally covered with fabric, since replaced with vinyl). These cars also featured push-button doors requiring passengers to activate, to increase air-conditioning efficiency. These proved unpopular and the push-buttons on the doors were removed.

The C set was distinguished externally by a fibreglass moulding mounted on the front of the power carriage. It was originally in the State Rail Authority white with orange and red candy livery stripes on the lower portion. C3596 was the only power car to have its Candy-liveried front repainted in CityRail blue and yellow prior to its CityDecker refurbishment in 1998. The chopper cars were amongst the heaviest in the suburban fleet, with the power cars weighing 52 tonnes.

The order was for 56 cars:

In service
The first set entered service in July 1986, operating out of Mortdale Maintenance Depot, some were delivered to Hornsby Maintenance Depot, but by December 1988, all were operating out of Punchbowl Maintenance Depot as sets K40-K51.

The chopper cars were originally targeted as K sets and for a while when they entered service, they ran together with the then-force ventilated K sets. This however caused problems in service as force-ventilated cars were fitted with camshaft control and led to jerking while accelerating. By December 1990, they had been retargeted as C42–C54. In January 1991, these were reformed as 6-car sets numbered C1–C8. By June 1991, all had been transferred to Hornsby Maintenance Depot.

One carriage, C3596 of set C6, was painted in a livery having its fiber-glass front being painted in CityRail colours, with the L7 logo.

During the late 1990s, all were refurbished by A Goninan & Co as part of the CityDecker program. This saw the interiors refurbished with white walls and ceilings, grey floors and blue seats. Power cars received a destination indicator and had the yellow apron livery applied which includes a grey front with yellow over the bottom half.

In 2001, the C sets were once again reformed into seven 8-car sets. A 6-car C Set was re-formed in late 2006 due to car T4262 being seriously damaged by an arson attack at Villawood in October 2006, however the full 8-car set later went back in operation.

In July 2017, asbestos was found in the circuit breaker panels, which was inside the driver compartment of the C sets, with all withdrawn for inspection.

From November 2017 until they were retired from service, all C Sets operated out of Flemington Maintenance Depot.

Prior to their retirement, C sets operated on the following lines:
T2 Inner West and Leppington Line: Leppington or Parramatta to City Circle via Granville
T3 Bankstown Line: Liverpool or Lidcombe to City Circle via Bankstown
T8 Airport and South Line: Macarthur To City Circle via Airport or Sydenham

Retirement

The C sets were gradually phased out from September 2020 to February 2021, being replaced by B sets. The C sets ran their final revenue timetabled service on 26 February 2021 on the Airport & South Line. A farewell to the C Sets tour by the Sydney Electric Train Society took place on 6 March 2021 visiting Mount Victoria and Hawkesbury River.

Two C sets (C1 and C5) remained as standby sets for emergencies from their retirement until 30 April 2021.

Two carriages, C3581 and T4272 were sent to Fire and Rescue NSW on 6 May 2021 for training purposes.

On 12 July 2021, three of the four remaining C Sets were transferred from Flemington to Chullora for scrapping.

Preservation 
In July 2021, the Sydney Electric Train Society (SETS) announced that they would be preserving four carriages for heritage. These carriages were taken from sets C5 and C9. It is intended that they will be operational for tours operated by SETS, including the Great Northern Chopper Tour, which was initially scheduled for 28 August 2021, but was postponed due to COVID-19, with no new date announced since.

Notes and references

Further reading

External links
 
 Technical diagrams and specifications (archived) Transport for NSW

Electric multiple units of New South Wales
Double-decker EMUs
Sydney Trains
Train-related introductions in 1986
1500 V DC multiple units of New South Wales